Big Brother 2006, also known as Big Brother 7, was the seventh series of the British reality television series Big Brother. The show followed a total of twenty-two contestants, known as housemates, who were isolated from the outside world for an extended period of time in a custom built house. Each week, one or more of the housemates were eliminated from the competition and left the House. The last remaining housemate, Pete Bennett, was declared the winner, winning a cash prize of £100,000.

The series launched on Channel 4 on 18 May 2006 and ended on 18 August 2006, lasting 93 days - the joint-second longest British edition of Big Brother to date (together with the ninth and tenth series, and one day shorter than the eighth series). Davina McCall returned as presenter for her seventh consecutive year. Fourteen housemates entered on launch night, with an additional eight being introduced in later weeks. The series was watched by an average of 4.7 million viewers, the third highest viewed series of the show to date. It was also the first series since the show's inception to be broadcast in 16:9 aspect ratio, as opposed to 4:3.

Big Brother 7 was the subject of viewer complaints and press attention regarding a variety of controversial issues, including the wellbeing of certain participants and the decision to allow former housemates to re-enter. In 2010, the series was voted the British public's favourite series of Big Brother.

Production

Eye logo
The eye this year featured two spiral shapes, one black and one yellow

Title sequence
The title sequence contained phrases such as, at the very beginning with a screen resembling an FBI Anti-Piracy Warning: "This is the title sequence for Big Brother", "Not for transmission", and a copyright year of 1903 (written MCMIII), the birth year of George Orwell. Parts of the sequence include CCTV-style footage of the Wandsworth Underpass featured at the start of the film version of A Clockwork Orange. The time and date displayed at the bottom keep repeating the digit seven, signifying the seventh series of the show. Other words flashed on screen included "You are being observed", and, in sequence the text "cam 01", "cam 09", "cam 08" and "cam 04" was shown at the top of the screen, making 1984, another reference to Nineteen Eighty-Four.

Broadcasts
Davina McCall hosted the main eviction show, as well as the live launch and finale. She would also host the main Channel 4 show on other nights, that may involve a twist or a new housemate arriving. The nightly highlight shows were once again narrated by Marcus Bentley. This was the last series to feature a highlights show the night after the finale, showing the housemates last day in the house.

Dermot O'Leary returned as host of Big Brother's Little Brother on Channel 4, he also hosted Big Brother's Big Brain, a new psychology show broadcast late on Monday nights on Channel 4, usually after the main show.

For the first time since BB launched, live action was available exclusively online, with paid subscription, through the official Channel 4 website; Channel 4 claimed that the decision to cease any live streaming to terrestrial, cable or satellite channels, was as a direct result of the public outrage which followed the "Fight Night" incident in last years show, however many fans were of the belief that this was simply Channel 4 and programme makers Endemol 'cashing in'.
Diary Room Uncut returned and was extended to one hour and broadcast on Saturday nights, as well as a half hour segment on Monday nights.

Russell Brand returned for Big Brother's Big Mouth in a new late-night time slot, straight after the Channel 4 show, it had previously obtained this slot during the previous celebrity series. The show contained a much more adult theme due to the new time slot. It was broadcast Tuesday to Friday.

Sponsor
The Carphone Warehouse remained as sponsor.

House

The interior of the house was much smaller than the year before. The living room was brought back inside the house, with two glass doors separating it from the main floor area. On Launch Night, McCall said the room will change colour depending on what mood the housemates were in, however the walls only changed colour on eviction nights. The bedroom was across from the living room, and featured a waterbed, the bathroom was accessed through the bedroom, and featured a bath, shower and also a toilet. The kitchen was small and beside the door leading to the garden. In the garden, which was much larger than the house, was a barbecue, a pool, a seating area and a bridge titled The Bridge to Nowhere which led to another seating area. The interior stairs remained closed off once again, and had a yellow and black theme.

The House Next Door
The House Next Door was a group of rooms connected to the original house via the Diary Room. On 30 June, five new housemates entered this house. The public, instead of voting for a housemate to be evicted, voted to transfer one of the current housemates to also live in the new house.
Aisleyne was voted to be moved into the House Next Door along with 5 new housemates; Jonathan, Spiral, Jennie, Michael and Jayne. Aisleyne was then required to evict another housemate, and chose Jonathan.
The House Next Door was also used later on in the series. In Week 10 it featured in the "Prison Task" and in Week 12 it housed four previous evictees, Grace, Mikey,  Lea and Nikki who had been voted by the public to re-enter the House.

Housemates
Fourteen housemates entered the House on launch night, and eight other housemates entered the House later during the series, making a total of twenty-two housemates competing in Big Brother 7.  Two of these eight housemates were replacement housemates Sam and Aisleyne, arriving on Day 12, who were introduced to the housemates as part of the Meal or No Meal task after the departure of Shahbaz and Dawn. George decided to leave the House of his own will, a rule all housemates are allowed to take advantage of at any time, on Day 13 as he "did not want to be famous". On Day 23, Susie entered the House as Big Brother's lucky Golden Ticket winner, she declared on entry that she was a nymphomaniac and would probably have sex with someone during her stay.  Five more housemates entered on Day 44 (Jonathan, Spiral, Jennie, Michael and Jayne) to the House Next Door, totalling 22 housemates - the joint-second highest number of housemates of Big Brother UK to date (together with the tenth and eighteenth series, and one housemate fewer than the eighth series).

This series saw the largest number of housemates to leave without being evicted, with three exiting the House.  This beat series 3, where there were a total of fourteen housemates and two people walked; and series 5, in which there were a total of thirteen housemates and two were ejected. Housemate numbers also topped series 6, in which even after the "Secret Garden" twist, there were only a total of sixteen contestants. At one point there were more additional housemates than original housemates in this series: during Week 9, following Nikki's eviction there was a total of six additional housemates and five original housemates, having entered the House on launch night.

Golden tickets
During the first three weeks of the series, Channel 4 conducted a promotion in conjunction with Nestle to distribute 100 "golden tickets" randomly throughout Kit Kat chocolate bars, in a style reminiscent of the story Charlie and the Chocolate Factory. Members of the public finding these tickets were permitted to use them to give themselves a chance to become a Big Brother housemate and bypass the standard auditions process.
Golden ticket holders were invited to a television show where one of them, Susie Verrico, was chosen to enter the House by housemate Aisleyne picking a ball out of a machine at random.
This contest caused some controversy, with the Advertising Standards Authority saying that the terms and conditions of the draw should have been made clearer in related advertisements, and that an independent adjudicator should have been present before and during the draw.

Weekly summary

Nominations table

Notes

: There were no nominations in Week 1. Instead, all housemates except Bonnie, Dawn and Glyn formed the Big Brotherhood and were immune from eviction, while the housemates excluded from the Brotherhood did not receive their suitcases and faced the public vote. Because Dawn was ejected from the house, it was only Bonnie and Glyn that faced the public vote.
: As punishment for discussing nominations, Sezer and Imogen were banned from nominating. As new housemates, Aisleyne and Sam could not nominate and could not be nominated by their fellow housemates. George had walked before nominations were made.
: Imogen was banned from nominating on Day 15 because the night before, she had disclosed to her fellow housemates the fact that she was unable to nominate the previous week. Lisa was also banned on Day 18 after telling Imogen who she nominated in the previous week.
: As the Golden Housemate, only Susie was eligible to nominate this week. Lisa could not be nominated, having won a task set by Big Brother. The two housemates Susie nominated were Grace and Nikki.
: During the previous week, Glyn, Imogen, Lea, Lisa and Nikki discussed nominations. As punishment, the five of them had to each nominate one of their fellow rule-breakers in front of their fellow housemates. The one or more housemate(s) with the most nominations would face eviction; Nikki was chosen. The remaining housemates nominated as normal, selecting from everyone except Nikki.
: This week's public vote was not to evict a housemate, but to vote them into the House Next Door. The housemates nominated as usual, but were unaware of the fake eviction or of the House Next Door. Aisleyne was not evicted, but instead moved next door.
: Aisleyne was told that she had to evict four of the five new housemates who were living in the House Next Door. However, she was not told that the first three housemates she chose would join the others in the main house. Her fourth nomination, for Jonathan, was for real, and he was evicted. Aisleyne, Jennie, Jonathan, Michael and Spiral were in the House Next Door during the nominations, and therefore did not take part. As a new housemate, Jayne could not nominate and could not be nominated by her fellow housemates. As punishment for telling Aisleyne he had nominated her the previous week, Pete was banned from nominating.
: As punishment for Jayne discussing the outside world, nominations were cancelled and everyone except Jayne automatically faced the public vote.
: The housemates were put into pairs of "Best Friends": these were Aisleyne & Jennie; Glyn & Mikey; Imogen & Susie; Pete & Richard and Michael & Spiral. Each pair nominated one housemate. The housemates with the most nominations faced eviction with their "Best Friend". Unlike previous weeks, this week was a vote to save.
: As part of an ongoing task, housemates had to nominate using an 'Automated Big Brother' phone system. Whilst announcing nominations, 'Automated Big Brother' "broke down", having only announced Imogen's name. Unbeknownst to the housemates, this week was a double eviction.
: After Susie's eviction on Day 79, the public voted for which 4 ex-housemates they would like to move into the House Next Door. George, Shahbaz, Dawn and Jonathan were not eligible to re-enter as they had not left the House via a Public vote. Bonnie and Sezer were also not eligible due to legal reasons. On Day 83, Grace, Lea, Mikey and Nikki moved into the House Next Door.
: Jennie won a task set by Big Brother and was given a guaranteed place in the final. On Day 86, the housemates in the main house chose Nikki to re-enter the house, where she became eligible to win. Grace, Lea and Mikey were therefore re-evicted.
 There were no nominations in the final week. The public were voting for the housemate they wanted to win, rather than evict.

Ratings
These viewing figures are taken from BARB.

Criticism and controversy

Selection of certain housemates
The programme attracted criticism on 31 May for putting several vulnerable people in the Big Brother House. Pete has Tourette syndrome. Shahbaz was revealed to be mentally and emotionally unstable and threatened to commit suicide on live television. He was being monitored by production team psychologists after commenting on how he intended to commit suicide whilst in the house. Many of the housemates were accused of bullying Shahbaz. He left the house on Day 6. Shahbaz admitted after leaving the house that he downplayed his mental condition during the selection process.

Lea suffers from body dysmorphic disorder; Sam has admitted to being shunned by family members because of their homosexuality and gender identity; and Nikki has suffered from anorexia and been sectioned in the past due to the condition.

Welsh language criticism
Further criticism arose when Welsh contestant Glyn Wise was reprimanded for communicating in his first language, Welsh, with fellow Welsh housemate Imogen Thomas. Big Brother deemed this a form of 'code' and issued a warning to Glyn, who retorted "But Welsh is a British language". Following the incident, the Welsh Language Society complained to Channel 4, the regulator Ofcom and S4C. Clearly, it was no longer a problem after this as Glyn and Imogen continued to converse in Welsh. Such discussions were broadcast with English-language subtitles.

Return of ex-housemates
On Day 83, four previous evictees entered the 'House Next Door' following a public vote between ten previous Housemates. Nikki received 63% of the vote, whilst Grace got 8.4%, and Lea and Mikey 7.3% each. Their presence was revealed to the other housemates and Imogen and Richard, who were up for eviction that week, joined them. Nikki was chosen by the remaining housemates to return to the Big Brother House and become eligible to win the £100,000 prize money and Grace, Mikey and Lea left the House Next Door.

This decision to allow previous evictees to become eligible to win the show was criticised. Channel 4 received 500 complaints from viewers about this matter and Media watchdog Ofcom confirmed that it had received over 1,000 complaints, and referred viewers to ICSTIS. Soon after the four ex-housemates entered the House Next Door, ICSTIS released a statement confirming that it was dealing with over 2,500 complaints and launched an official investigation. On 5 October 2006, they ruled that Channel 4 had breached its code and imposed £50,000 'administrative charges'.

On the day prior to the voting results being announced, however, Channel 4 stated that it still considered the vote to be a success as they had already received 400,000 votes, making it the most successful of the series. 36p from each call and 26p from each text also went to charity, raising over £250,000 for charity on the vote alone. The money was split among three charities: Shelter, The Teenage Cancer Trust and the winning housemate's chosen charity, which Pete chose as the Tourette's Association.

References

External links
 Big Brother - Series 7 at Channel4.com

2006 British television seasons
 7